The 20th Regiment, Tennessee Infantry was an infantry regiment from Tennessee that served in the Confederate States Army during the American Civil War. Notable battles that the regiment was engaged in include the Battle of Mill Springs and the Battle of Chickamauga.

See also
List of Tennessee Confederate Civil War units

References

External links
 

Units and formations of the Confederate States Army from Tennessee
Military units and formations disestablished in 1865
1865 disestablishments in Tennessee
1861 establishments in Tennessee
Military units and formations established in 1861